The Dinosaur Interplanetary Gazette (D.I.G.), founded July 4, 1996, was a pioneering online science magazine. It is arguably the first continuously published online science magazine in history. The founder-publisher was Edward Summer. The webzine was hosted by Interport, an early ISP in New York City that was eventually taken over by RCN.

The Dinosaur Interplanetary Gazette covered news related to all the sciences, but paleontology in particular. Paleontology and dinosaurs were only an initial topic that led to all forms of related sciences and other fields: mathematics, physics, biology, sociology, literature, motion pictures.

Awards and International Readership 
Although it was originally intended for younger readers, the style of writing apparently made it accessible to readers of all ages and it was popular literally worldwide. The publication received mail from readers in more than 159 countries. The magazine currently (July 2006) claims to have readers in 175 countries.

Over the initial five years of publication, it was recognized with more than 30 awards. It was recommended by the National Education Association (NEA) along with only one other science site published by Bill Nye The Science Guy. It was a featured website in Netscape, The New York Times, Natural History Magazine.

Pioneering Website 
D.I.G. was one of the earliest websites to run continuous "public appearances" by working scientists. Organized through early "message boards," a feature called "The Bone Zone" (tm) allowed the world's most famous paleontologists to receive and answer questions from the magazine's readers. More than two dozen renowned paleontologists, writers, artists and journalists participated in this early experiment in public education and entertainment.

Celluloid Dinosaurs 
One of the most enduring features of The Dinosaur Interplanetary Gazette was Celluloid Dinosaurs. Celluloid Dinosaurs was a history not only of dinosaur movies, but also of the related arts and sciences. The feature took the viewpoint that dinosaurs as we know them in movies like Jurassic Park or King Kong are a product of the collaboration of many different sciences and literary disciplines.  Dinosaurs exist only as fossils, so visualizing them on the screen (or in books) involves extensive research and imagination.

This feature has been cited in university level textbooks and standard reference works in the field of paleontology.

References

External links
It is still online at www.dinosaur.org
The Bone Zone
Celluloid Dinosaurs
All Dinosaur Games

Children's magazines published in the United States
Defunct magazines published in the United States
Education magazines
Magazines established in 1996
Magazines with year of disestablishment missing
Magazines published in New York City
Online magazines published in the United States
Science and technology magazines published in the United States